Thirumanikuzhi or Thirumaanikuzhi  is a revenue village in Cuddalore district, state of Tamil Nadu, India. The village history is built around the Vamaneeswarar temple located in the village.

External links 
 Official Web Site of Cuddalore District
 Official website of Tamil Nadu
 Government of Tamil Nadu

References 

Villages in Cuddalore district
Cities and villages in Cuddalore taluk